Frederick Steele (1819–1868) was an American military general.

Frederick Steele may also refer to:

Frederick Steele (cricketer) (1847–1915) 
Freddie Steele (1912–1984), American boxer and film actor
Freddie Steele (footballer) (1916–1976), English footballer

See also
Frederic Dorr Steele (1873–1944), American illustrator
Fred Steel (1884–before 1945), English footballer